William Walton's Sinfonia Concertante is a three-movement piece for piano and orchestra, first performed in 1928. The composer revised it extensively in 1943. It is an early work, in the anti-romantic style favoured by Walton before the 1930s. There have been several recordings of the piece, featuring both the original and the revised versions.

Background and first performances
In 1925–26, Walton wrote a ballet score that he hoped would be accepted by the impresario Sergei Diaghilev for his company, the Ballets Russes. Diaghilev rejected the score, and Walton reworked it as a concert piece. He dedicated each movement to one of his friends and patrons the Sitwells, the first to Osbert, the second to Edith and the third to "Sachie" (Sacheverell).

The work was first given on 5 January 1928 at a concert of the Royal Philharmonic Society in the Queen's Hall, London. The soloist was York Bowen and the conductor was Ernest Ansermet. The concert was broadcast nationally by the BBC. Walton substantially revised the work in 1943 removing orchestral counterpoint and simplifying the solo piano part. The premiere of the revised version was at the Philharmonic Hall, Liverpool on 9 February 1944, with Cyril Smith as soloist and the Liverpool Philharmonic Orchestra conducted by Malcolm Sargent.

Structure

The instrumentation of the original version comprises piano solo, with two flutes, piccolo, two oboes, cor anglais, clarinet, bass clarinet, two bassoons, contrabassoon, four horns, three trumpets, three trombones, tuba, timpani, two percussion (tambourine, cymbals, side drum, bass drum, glockenspiel, xylophone) and strings.

The revised version is scored for piano solo, with two flutes, piccolo, two oboes, cor anglais, two clarinet, two bassoons, four horns, two trumpets, three trombones, tuba, timpani, two percussion (tambourine, cymbals, side drum, bass drum, glockenspiel, xylophone) and strings.

There are three movements:

Maestoso
Andante comodo
Allegro vivo sempre scherzando

Critical reception
The first performance was well received, with certain reservations about style and orchestration, but was rather overshadowed by the main work in the concert, the first complete performance in Britain of Ravel's Daphnis et Chloé.
When Walton conducted the second performance of the Sinfonia Concertante in April 1928, The Times said:

In a 1984 study of Walton, Neil Tierney describes the Sinfonia Concertante as "a clever and entertaining piece, free from the grimmer features of Walton's mature style … anti-romantic and flavoured by a satirical gaiety".

Recordings

Source: William Walton Trust.

Notes, references and sources

Notes

References

Sources
 

Compositions by William Walton
1928 compositions